Mecicobothrium is a genus of dwarf tarantulas first described by Eduardo Ladislao Holmberg in 1882.

These spiders have three tarsal claws. The cephalic groove (fovea) is longitudinal. The abdomen has plates. The male palpal bulb lies in a long modified final joint. The posterior lateral spinnerets are very long, with the last joint whiplike.

Species
, the genus contained only two species:
 Mecicobothrium baccai Lucas et al., 2006 — Brazil
 Mecicobothrium thorelli Holmberg, 1882 — Argentina, Uruguay

References

Mygalomorphae
Mygalomorphae genera
Taxa named by Eduardo Ladislao Holmberg